French School of Lusaka (formerly École française Champollion de Lusaka) is a French international school on the property of the Alliance française campus in Longacres, Lusaka, Zambia. The Embassy of France in Zambia and French families campaigned to have the school established; it opened in 1980 and moved to its current site in September 2005. The school serves preschool through CM2, and using the National Centre for Distance Education (CNED) distance education programme it also serves collège (junior high school) and lycée (senior high school/sixth form) until terminale (final year).

References

External links

 French School of Lusaka
 

Lusaka
International schools in Zambia
Private schools in Zambia
Schools in Lusaka